Myrte of the Demons or  Myrte en de Demonen  is a 1950 Dutch film directed by Paul Bruno Schreiber.

Cast
 Paulida Schreiber ... Myrte
Harry Berg		
Ludzer Eringa	... 	The Moon
Sonia Gables		
Kees Kick		
Johan Mittertreiner		
John Moore		
Jan Musch		
Mascha ter Weeme		
Jap Tjong		
Marie Jeanne van der Veen		
Theo van Vliet	... 	Wamli
Dick Versluis

External links 
 

1950 films
Dutch black-and-white films
Dutch fantasy films
1950s fantasy films
1950s Dutch-language films